The Cape Town Affair is director Robert D. Webb's 1967 glamorized spy film produced by 20th Century Fox at Killarney Film Studios in South Africa. The film stars Claire Trevor, James Brolin, and Jacqueline Bisset. It is a remake of the 1953 picture Pickup on South Street.

It was Brolin's first starring role. Both he and Bisset were under contract to Fox. He later said "I didn't like it much but we [he and Bisset] weren't bad."

Plot
The film is set in 1967, at the height of the Cold War. On a Cape Town, South Africa, city bus, a young woman named Candy (Jacqueline Bissett) suspects she's being trailed by government agents. They have correctly deduced she is acting as a courier for Communist operatives. However, a small distraction occurs when a pickpocket, Skip McCoy (James Brolin), deftly lifts a wallet from Candy's purse before exiting at the next stop. Candy uses the diversion to slip away from her pursuers. But later, when checking her purse for the wallet, she discovers it is missing. The wallet's content, an envelope containing state secrets on microfilm, is now in the possession of McCoy. Naturally, Candy's employers are displeased, and they order her to find and retrieve the stolen microfilm—or else. As a result, Candy begins to question her own allegiances.

Meanwhile, government agents solicit local Cape Town authorities for their assistance in tracking down the pickpocket. With valuable assistance from underworld contact Samantha "Sam" Williams (Claire Trevor), they locate the elusive McCoy who proves uncooperative at first. But when he becomes acquainted with Candy and begins to grasp the evil of those behind the theft of government secrets, his patriotic fervor becomes aroused. Before long, he is surprised to find himself aligned with both Candy and the police in tracking down and exposing enemies of the state.

Cast
 Claire Trevor as Sam Williams
 James Brolin as Skip McCoy
 Jacqueline Bisset as Candy
 Bob Courtney as Capt. Herrick, Security Branch  
 John Whiteley as Joey  
 Gordon Mulholland as Warrant Officer Du Plessis  
 Siegfried Mynhardt as Fenton  
 James Gordon White as Sgt. Beukes  
 Gabriel Bayman as Mohammed the Fence  
 Raymond Matuson as Lighting Louis / Espinosa 
 Patrick Mynhardt as Myburgh

Production
Some of the Cape Town locations include Long Street, apartments along Beach Road in Mouille Point and Green Point, the harbour docks now within the Waterfront, the town centre near the railway station and city hall.

Reception
Commentators describe the film as dull, slow-paced, poorly acted and tedious. The film does, however, paint an interesting picture of life in South Africa under apartheid as seen from the point of view of official government policy. All the leading characters are white and even street scenes contain few non-whites.

See also
 The Jackals

References

External links
 
 

1967 films
1960s spy thriller films
Films directed by Robert D. Webb
Remakes of American films
20th Century Fox films
Films set in Cape Town
Films set in South Africa
Films shot in South Africa
1960s English-language films